Sergio Jimenez may refer to:

 Sergio Jiménez (1937–2007), Mexican actor
 Sérgio Jimenez (born 1984), Brazilian racecar driver
 Sergio Jiménez (fencer) (born 1940), Chilean Olympic fencer